Last Call is a fantasy novel by American writer Tim Powers.  It was published by William Morrow & Co in 1992.  It is the first book in a loose trilogy called Fault Lines: the second book, Expiration Date (1995), is vaguely related to Last Call, and the third book, Earthquake Weather (1997), acts as a sequel to the first two books.

Major themes
Like many of Powers' novels, Last Call features a detailed magic system, here based on divinatory tarot, and draws on mythical or historical events and characters, in this case Bugsy Siegel and the development of Las Vegas casinos as well as the legend of the Fisher King.  Powers makes use of T. S. Eliot's poem The Waste Land throughout, which also features the Fisher King legend.

Awards
Last Call won the World Fantasy Award for Best Novel and the Locus Award for Best Fantasy Novel in 1993.

References

External links
 
 Last Call at Worlds Without End

Novels by Tim Powers
1992 American novels
American fantasy novels
1992 fantasy novels
Novels set in the Las Vegas Valley
William Morrow and Company books
World Fantasy Award for Best Novel-winning works